Special Book Services (SBS) is the leading distributor of language teaching materials in Brazil with its warehouse facilities in São Paulo and a chain of over 24 SBS bookshops located in key cities and state capitals. The entrepreneur Sabina Pino Zea manages this company from NYC and distribute thousands of material around the world.

External links
SBS homepage

Bookshops of Brazil